Phillip Schofield's South African Adventure, is a British television documentary series, broadcast on ITV and presented by Phillip Schofield. The series was originally broadcast in segments on This Morning.

Speaking to Christine Lampard on ITV's Lorraine, Schofield said that he would love to do another series of the show.

Production
In September 2016, it was announced that Schofield would star in a new TV mini-series for This Morning. Filming took place when Schofield was away during September 2016.

In February 2017 the mini series was picked up by ITV and would be aired as a 3x30 minute series in a prime time slot, the first episode aired on 24 February 2017.

Series overview

Episodes
Official viewing figures are from BARB.

References

2017 British television series debuts
2017 British television series endings
2010s British documentary television series
ITV documentaries
Television series by ITV Studios
English-language television shows
Television shows set in South Africa